Younes Chaib (born 2 April 1984 in France) is a French retired footballer.

References

Association football forwards
French footballers
BSV Schwarz-Weiß Rehden players
Lyon La Duchère players
A.S. Gubbio 1910 players
Genoa C.F.C. players
A.C. Reggiana 1919 players
A.S.D. Sangiovannese 1927 players
Pisa S.C. players
Giulianova Calcio players
S.S.D. Pro Sesto players
Living people
1984 births